Dortmund-Huckarde is a railway station on the Welver–Sterkrade railway situated in Dortmund in western Germany. It is classified by Deutsche Bahn as a category 6 station. It is served by Rhine-Ruhr S-Bahn line S 2 every 30 minutes.

References 

Railway stations in Dortmund
S2 (Rhine-Ruhr S-Bahn)
Rhine-Ruhr S-Bahn stations
Railway stations in Germany opened in 1991